Lawrence Montaigne (February 26, 1931 – March 17, 2017) was an American actor, writer, dancer, and stuntman. As an actor, he was known for his appearances on many 1960s-era television shows.

Life and career 
Born in New York, but later raised in Rome, Italy, Montaigne spoke several languages - a skill he used to his advantage in securing roles in international productions. He served in the United States Marine Corps and was only one platoon apart in the Parris Island boot camp from his future friend Steve McQueen.

Like many young American actors he travelled to Italy to make films in the early 1960s.

He appeared in the role of Dr. Chauncy Hartlund in the 1965 Perry Mason episode, "The Case of the Carefree Coronary." In 1966, Montaigne portrayed the Romulan Decius in the Star Trek episode "Balance of Terror". In 1967, he portrayed Soldado, the rogue apache chief, in Hondo. He had also been considered for the role of Mr. Spock, as Leonard Nimoy was being considered for a role on Mission Impossible. A year later, he portrayed the Vulcan Stonn, the paramour of Spock's intended bride T'Pring, in the episode "Amok Time"—a role that he reprised in 2006 in the unofficial mini-series Star Trek: Of Gods and Men.

Additionally, he guest-starred on Batman, Voyage to the Bottom of the Sea, The Man From U.N.C.L.E., Blue Light, Mission: Impossible, The Time Tunnel, The Invaders, Perry Mason, McCloud, Hogan's Heroes, Bonanza and The Feather and Father Gang.

His motion picture appearances include roles in The Great Escape (1963), Captain Sindbad (1963), Tobruk (1967), The Power (1968), The Psycho Lover (1970), Escape to Witch Mountain (1975), Framed (1975), Young Lady Chatterley (1977), Deadly Blessing (1981) and Dakota (1988). During the 1980s, Montaigne taught film at North Texas State University.

For some years, Montaigne lived in Las Vegas, Nevada, and translated medical texts for a publishing firm. In 2007, Montaigne voiced a guest-starring role in the pilot episode of the web series Star Trek: The Continuing Mission.

Montaigne died on March 17, 2017, aged 86.

Filmography

References

External links 
 
 
   Lawrence Montaigne's Personal Website (basically a dead link)

1931 births
2017 deaths
Jewish American male actors
People from Brooklyn
American male television actors
American male film actors
United States Marines
American stunt performers
20th-century American translators
21st-century American Jews